Alexander Edward Flett (born 20 September 1992) is an English semi-professional footballer who plays for Cleethorpes Town, as a midfielder.

Career
Born in Grimsby, Flett began his career with the youth team of Bradford City, and was awarded a first-team squad number in February 2011, alongside Dominic Rowe, with squad number 31. In March 2011, Flett went on a loan experience loan to Ossett Town. After returning to Bradford City, Flett made his senior debut for them on 7 May 2011, in a 1–5 defeat at home in the Football League. Flett was offered his first professional contract by Bradford on 9 May 2011. Flett was released from his contract with Bradford City by mutual consent on 10 August 2011, having made one appearance for them in the Football League.

Later that same month, Flett signed for Northern Premier League Division One South club Brigg Town.

He joined Cleethorpes Town in January 2012. By May 2017 he was the club's captain. That same month the club were runners-up in the 2017 FA Vase Final.

Career statistics

References

1992 births
Living people
Footballers from Grimsby
English footballers
Association football midfielders
Bradford City A.F.C. players
Ossett Town F.C. players
Brigg Town F.C. players
Cleethorpes Town F.C. players
English Football League players
Northern Premier League players